Midnight (Spanish: Medianoche) is a 1949 Mexican crime film directed by Tito Davison and starring Arturo de Córdova, Elsa Aguirre and Marga López.

The film's sets were designed by the art director José Rodríguez Granada.

Cast

References

Bibliography 
 Arturo Agramonte & Luciano Castillo. Ramón Peón, el hombre de los glóbulos negros. Editorial de Ciencias Sociales, 2003.

External links 
 

1949 films
1949 crime films
Mexican crime films
1940s Spanish-language films
Films directed by Tito Davison
Films scored by Manuel Esperón
Mexican black-and-white films
1940s Mexican films